"Chasing Rivers" is a song by Swedish singer Nano. The song was performed for the first time in Melodifestivalen 2019, where it made it to the final. This was Nanos first music single after his 2017 Melodifestivalen entry "Hold On".

Charts

References

2019 singles
English-language Swedish songs
Melodifestivalen songs of 2019
Swedish pop songs
Songs written by Linnea Deb
Songs written by Joy Deb
Songs written by Lise Cabble
2019 songs